Tee Boon Tsong is a Malaysian politician from DAP. He is the Member of Johor State Legislative Assembly for Senai since 2018.

Politics 
He was the political secretary for Liew Chin Tong before becoming the state assemblyman for Senai.

Election result

External links

References 

Democratic Action Party (Malaysia) politicians
Members of the Johor State Legislative Assembly
Malaysian people of Chinese descent
Living people
Year of birth missing (living people)